Anderson Boyd (February 1835 - ?) was an American politician.

Boyd was born in South Carolina. In November 1863, he enlisted in the 3rd United States Colored Cavalry Regiment.

He represented Oktibbeha County in the Mississippi House of Representatives from 1874 to 1875.

See also
African-American officeholders during and following the Reconstruction era

References

1835 births
African-American state legislators in Mississippi
Members of the Mississippi House of Representatives
19th-century American politicians
African-American politicians during the Reconstruction Era
People of Mississippi in the American Civil War
African Americans in the American Civil War
Military personnel from Mississippi
People from Oktibbeha County, Mississippi
Year of death missing